Alsophis manselli, the Montserrat racer, is a species of snake endemic to the Caribbean island of Montserrat.

Description
The Montserrat racer can reach nearly a meter in length.  It feeds on lizards and small rodents.  It rarely bites humans, but may release a foul-smelling (though harmless) cloacal secretion when disturbed.

Taxonomy
Along with Alsophis sibonius from Dominica, it was previously considered a subspecies of Alsophis antillensis.

References

Alsophis
Endemic fauna of Montserrat
Snakes of the Caribbean
Reptiles of Montserrat
Reptiles described in 1933
Taxa named by Hampton Wildman Parker